Title 42 expulsions are removals by the U.S. government of persons who have recently been in a country where a communicable disease was present. During the COVID-19 pandemic, the Trump administration used this provision (section 265) to generally block land entry for many migrants. This practice has been continued by the Biden administration with expansion. Title 42 of the United States Code includes numerous sections dealing with public health, social welfare, and civil rights, but, in the context of immigration, the phrase "Title 42" came to be used to refer specifically to expulsions under section 265.

The program allows the U.S. Border Patrol and U.S. Customs and Border Protection to prohibit the entry of persons who potentially pose a health risk by being subject to previously-announced travel restrictions or because by unlawfully entering the country to bypass health-screening measures. Its use was implemented under the Trump administration and has continued under the Biden administration to prohibit asylum seekers from lawfully petitioning for asylum in the United States. Persons subject to the order are not held in congregate areas for processing and are instead immediately expelled to their country of last transit. If they are unable to be returned to the country of last transit (because that country will not accept them due to their nationality), the Border Patrol will work with its interagency partners to expel the person to their country of origin. Expulsions under Title 42 are not based on immigration status and are tracked separately from immigration. In some cases, this is not possible, and migrants may be expelled to a third country that will accept them based on previous residency. At the discretion of the administration, Title 42 can be used even for people who would normally have temporary protected status based on their country of origin.

Title 42 was unenforceable from November 15, 2022, when D.C. federal judge Emmet G. Sullivan ruled that the policy is a violation of the Administrative Procedure Act, until December 19 when the Chief Justice of the United States, John Roberts, issued a temporary hold on Sullivan's ruling, followed by the full court in a 5–4 vote on December 27.

Code
Title 42 of the United States Code, Chapter 6A, Subchapter II, Part G, Section 265 states:
§265. "Suspension of entries and imports from designated places to prevent spread of communicable diseases
Whenever the Surgeon General determines that by reason of the existence of any communicable disease in a foreign country there is serious danger of the introduction of such disease into the United States, and that this danger is so increased by the introduction of persons or property from such country that a suspension of the right to introduce such persons and property is required in the interest of the public health, the Surgeon General, in accordance with regulations approved by the President, shall have the power to prohibit, in whole or in part, the introduction of persons and property from such countries or places as he shall designate in order to avert such danger, and for such period of time as he may deem necessary for such purpose." (July 1, 1944, ch. 373, title III, §362, 58 Stat. 704.)

History
The provision was enacted as part of the Public Health Service Act of 1944.

In March 2020, the Center for Disease Control under the Trump administration issued a public health order allowing for the rapid expulsion of unauthorized border crossers and asylum seekers citing COVID-19 concerns. As it is considered an "expulsion" rather than a "deportation", the migrants are not afforded the right to make a case to stay in the U.S. before an immigration judge. Most migrants subject to Title 42 measures are returned to Mexico within hours. Trump advisor Stephen Miller had a role in shaping the policy, and has since defended it in interviews.

In November 2020, a federal court ordered a halt to the practice in regard to unaccompanied minor children; on January 29, 2021, the stay was lifted by DC Circuit Court of Appeals allowing minors to be expelled pending its review of the case. 

In February 2021, Mexico stopped accepting families with children under the program. Physicians for Human Rights notes that the policy has been applied unfairly against migrants and asylees and that its stated purpose of containing the spread of COVID-19 is dubious as the U.S. continues to allow millions of people to cross the US–Mexico border weekly. In early February 2021, the Mexican government announced that it would stop accepting non-Mexican family units with minor children returned to Mexico under Title 42.

In June 2021, it was reported that the Biden Administration may be considering rescinding Title 42. In September 2021, NPR reported that the Biden administration has defended Title 42 expulsion in court under the pretext of slowing the spread of COVID-19. 

In December 2021, Anne Schuchat, the second-highest official at the Centers for Disease Control, testified that the expulsions of migrants under Title 42 lacked a sufficient public health rationale.

In March 2022, the DC Circuit Court of Appeals ruled that the Biden admin can continue to swiftly remove migrant families under Title 42, but "only to places where they will not be persecuted or tortured." 

On April 1, 2022, the CDC officially announced they would rescind Title 42. However in order to allow for the implementation of a vaccine program to get migrants vaccinated at the border, the policy was not scheduled to officially end until May 23, 2022. On May 20, federal judge for the United States District Court for the Western District of Louisiana, Robert R. Summerhays, issued a ruling blocking the CDC from ending Title 42 expulsion.

In April 2022, the Biden Administration introduced a streamlined program for allowing an unlimited number of Ukrainian nationals who pass various checks and are sponsored by various organizations under the "Uniting for Ukraine" program to be excepted from Title 42, and get humanitarian parole and work permits. In October 2022, it introduced a similar program for Venezuelan nationals, who must arrive by air. The number of Venezuelans was capped at 24,000, and those arriving by crossing into Mexico or Panama illegally would start to be expelled under Title 42.

In October 2022, the Biden administration invoked Title 42 to expel Venezuelan migrants to Mexico. Amnesty International and Human Rights Watch criticized the decision.

On November 15, 2022, Senior Judge of the United States District Court for the District of Columbia, Emmet G. Sullivan, ruled that expulsions under Title 42 were a violation of the Administrative Procedure Act, noting that the Title was an "arbitrary and capricious" violation of the Act. The ruling required the United States government to process all asylum seekers under immigrant law as previous to Title 42's implementation, and Sullivan specifically called out the CDC for intentionally ignoring the negative effects of implementing Title 42 and not considering alternative approaches to expulsion such as vaccination, outdoor processing, and allowing asylum seekers to quarantine with U.S. relatives. Sullivan opined that the policy had no rational basis as COVID-19 was already widespread throughout the U.S. when the program was initiated. The ruling was celebrated by the ACLU, a plaintiff in the case.

On December 19, 2022, Chief Justice of the United States, John Roberts, temporarily maintained Title 42 and stayed the decision by Judge Emmet G. Sullivan. On December 27, the U.S. Supreme Court granted a stay against Sullivan's decision with a 5–4 split. The case, Arizona v. Mayorkas, was set for oral argument, though it was about whether the states were allowed to intervene, rather than the merits of the policy.

Criticism
Title 42 has been criticized by several human rights groups including the American Civil Liberties Union, Amnesty International USA, Human Rights Watch, Human Rights First, and the American Immigration Council. These groups argue that the policy allows the United States to illegally expel asylum seekers without any legal process.

In February 2021, more than 60 congresspeople, led by Congresswoman Frederica S. Wilson, House Foreign Affairs Committee Chair Gregory W. Meeks, Congresswoman Pramila Jayapal, and Homeland Security Committee Chair Bennie G. Thompson, sent a letter to Homeland Security Secretary Alejandro Mayorkas calling on him to end the practice. In the letter, they argued that Mayorkas should employ alternative forms of humanitarian relief for detainees subject to deportation for the remainder of the pandemic.

Statistics
Title 42 expulsions by month and by department are as follows:

See also 

 Immigration policy of Donald Trump
 Immigration policy of the Joe Biden administration

References

External links
 Title 42: The Misuse of Public Health to Restrict Asylum by Physicians for Human Rights (May 6, 2021) via YouTube

2020 controversies in the United States
Anti-immigration politics in the United States
Biden administration controversies
Illegal immigration to the United States
Immigration policy of Donald Trump
Right of asylum in the United States
Trump administration controversies
United States Department of Homeland Security